The Men's Individual Road Race of the 2009 UCI Road World Championships cycling event took place on 27 September in Mendrisio, Switzerland. The course of 262 km consisted of nineteen laps around an undulating circuit. The pre-race favourites came from the strong Italian and Spanish national squads, with Damiano Cunego and Alejandro Valverde both considered possible contenders.

The race was won by Australian Cadel Evans, the first Australian victory in the World road race. Evans, who took his third victory of the season, moved clear from a group of nine riders on the final lap to win the race.

Final classification

Riders who did not finish
89 riders failed to finish the race.

Nation qualification

References

Men's Road Race
UCI Road World Championships – Men's road race